Spuk aus der Gruft is a German television series.

See also
Spuk im Reich der Schatten (2000)
Spuk am Tor der Zeit (2002)
List of German television series

External links
 

German children's television series
German fantasy television series
1997 German television series debuts
1997 German television series endings
German-language television shows
Das Erste original programming